The H. C. Recktenwald Prize in Economics was awarded to several academic economists from 1995 to 2004. It is named for Prof. Horst Claus Recktenwald, a German economist, and was endowed by his wife, Hertha Recktenwald, after his death. 

The committee to select the prize recipients is nominated by the President of Friedrich-Alexander-University in Erlangen-Nuremberg, Germany.

Prize recipients
1995: Edmond Malinvaud
1997: Joseph E. Stiglitz
2000: Paul Krugman
2002: Paul Romer
2004: Oliver E. Williamson
2014: Emmanuel Saez

See also

 List of economics awards

References

External links
 H.C. Recktenwald Prize
 Horst Claus Recktenwald Foundation

Economics awards
University of Erlangen-Nuremberg